Thomas Bartlett may refer to:

 Thomas Bartlett (theologian) (1789–1864), English clergyman and theological writer
 Thomas Bartlett Jr. (1808–1876), US Representative from Vermont
 Thomas A. Bartlett (born 1930), American educator
 Thomas Bartlett (historian), author and professor of Irish history
 Doveman (Thomas Bartlett, born 1981), American singer and keyboard player

See also
 Tommy Bartlett (1914–1998), American showman
 Thomas Bartlet (disambiguation)